Benedetta Porcaroli (born June 11, 1998) is an Italian actress. She is best known for her role as Chiara Altieri in the Netflix series Baby (2018–2020)

Filmography

References

External links

1998 births
Living people
Actresses from Rome
Italian film actresses
Italian television actresses